The 1999–2000 season was Blackpool F.C.'s 92nd season (89th consecutive) in the Football League. They competed in the 24-team Division Two, then the third tier of English league football, finishing 22nd. As a result, they were relegated to the league's basement division.

Nigel Worthington resigned as manager during the season. He was replaced by the former Liverpool midfielder Steve McMahon.

The club suffered a tragedy on 30 January 2000 with the death of striker Martin Aldridge in a car crash near Northampton at the age of 25. Aldridge, who had been at Blackpool for 18 months, was on loan at Rushden & Diamonds at the time of his death.

John Murphy was the club's top scorer, with ten goals in all competitions.

On 15 January, Bloomfield Road hosted a "Break The Gate" promotion for the visit of Luton Town. Chairman Karl Oyston pledged that revenue generated from home supporters in excess of the hardcore 3500 would be made available to Steve McMahon for team strengthening. Two days later it was announced that £12,000 had been raised. The scheme was repeated for the visit of Brentford on 29 January.

Final league table

Results

Blackpool's score comes first

Legend

Football League Second Division

FA Cup

Football League Cup

Football League Trophy

Squad

Left club during season

References
Specific

General

Blackpool F.C. seasons
Blackpool